This article show all participating team squads at the 2004 FIVB Women's Volleyball World Grand Prix, played by twelve countries from 9 July to 1 August 2004 with the final round held in Reggio Calabria, Italy.

Head Coach: José Roberto Guimarães

Head Coach: Chen Zhonghe

Head Coach: Luis Felipe Calderón

Head Coach: Jorge Garbey

Head Coach: Lee Hee-Wan

Head Coach: Marco Bonitta

Head Coach: Shoichi Yanagimoto

Head Coach: Andrzej Niemczyk

Head Coach: Kim Cheol-yong

Head Coach: Nikolay Karpol

Head Coach: Nataphon Srisamutnak

Head Coach: Toshi Yoshida

References
FIVB
Teams Composition at FIVB.org

2004
2004 in volleyball